Kelafo is a town in eastern Ethiopia.

The UN-OCHA-Ethiopia website provides details of the health clinic in Kelafo, which was built in 1991 with funds and equipment provided by the Australian government. Kelafo is served by an airport (ICAO code HAKL), and a bridge across the Shebelle River which was scoured in the May 1995 floods.

Demographics 
Based on figures from the Central Statistical Agency in 2005, this town has an estimated total population of 14,242, of whom 7,522 are men and 6,720 are women. The 1997 census reported this town had a total population of 9,551 of whom 4,970 were men and 4,581 women. The largest two ethnic groups reported in this town were the Somali (96.85%), and the Amhara (1%); all other ethnic groups made up 2.15% of the population. It is the largest town in Kelafo woreda.

Notes 

Populated places in the Somali Region
Ajuran Sultanate